Marek Sokołowski (born March 11, 1978) is a retired Polish footballer who played as a midfielder or a defender (either side).

Career

Club
He joined Podbeskidzie Bielsko-Biała in 2010.

References

External links
 

Polish footballers
KSZO Ostrowiec Świętokrzyski players
Odra Wodzisław Śląski players
Dyskobolia Grodzisk Wielkopolski players
Obra Kościan players
Podbeskidzie Bielsko-Biała players
Polonia Warsaw players
Ekstraklasa players
1978 births
Living people
Footballers from Warsaw
Association football midfielders